The 2015 Kurume Best Amenity Cup was a professional tennis tournament played on outdoor grass courts. It was the eleventh edition of the tournament and part of the 2015 ITF Women's Circuit, offering a total of $50,000 in prize money. It took place in Kurume, Fukuoka, Japan, on 11–17 May 2015.

Singles main draw entrants

Seeds 

 1 Rankings as of 4 May 2015

Other entrants 
The following players received wildcards into the singles main draw:
  Akari Inoue
  Mai Minokoshi
  Ayumi Morita
  Akiko Yonemura

The following players received entry from the qualifying draw:
  Miyu Kato
  Makoto Ninomiya
  Chiaki Okadaue
  Marianna Zakarlyuk

Champions

Singles

 Nao Hibino def.  Eri Hozumi, 6–3, 6–1

Doubles

 Makoto Ninomiya /  Riko Sawayanagi def.  Eri Hozumi /  Junri Namigata, 7–6(12–10), 6–3

External links 
 2015 Kurume Best Amenity Cup at ITFtennis.com
 Official website 

2015 ITF Women's Circuit
2015
2015 in Japanese tennis